The European Association for Vision and Eye Research is a multidisciplinary scientific society that aims to encourage research and the dissemination of knowledge concerning the eye and vision by means of meetings, publications and exchange of information. It is an international non-profit association formed in agreement with the Belgian Law. EVER is the largest European research association that covers all areas of ophthalmology and the vision science. The association currently has members from over 48 countries within Europe and abroad, and is organized in 11 scientific sections.

EVER was founded in 1997 in Montpellier, France, when The Association for Eye Research (AER), the European Community Ophthalmic Research Association (ECORA) and the Joint European Meetings in Ophthalmology and Vision (JERMOV) merged, and recognized by the Belgian Royal Decree on 20 September 1998.

Functions and activities
EVER arranges its annual congress at the end of September or the beginning of October at a location close to the Mediterranean. The current location since 2012 has been Nice, France. Previously, the association has met in Palma de Mallorca, Spain, in 1998-2000, Alicante, Spain, in 2001-2003, Vilamoura, Portugal, in 2004-2006, Portoroz, Slovenia, in 2007-2009 and Crete, Greece, in 2010-2011. Central events include free papers, special interest symposia, and keynote lectures. The association collaborates with other societies in the same field and some of these convene annually with EVER.

Organizational structure
Membership is open to individuals of any nationality. Engagement or an interest in ophthalmic and vision research is required. A category for members-in-training also exists.

The association is governed by its General Assembly and Board, which are chaired by its President, according to its statutes and bye-laws. The members of the Board are elected from and by the effective members of the association. The Board has an Executive Council with a President, Secretary General, Treasurer, Program Secretary, President Elect, Vice President, Vice President Elect, Past President (ex officio), and EVER Foundation liaison (ex officio), and the Chairs of the 11 scientific sections:

 Anatomy / Cell Biology	
 Cornea / Ocular Surface	
 Electrophysiology / Physiological Optics / Vision Sciences
 Glaucoma	
 Immunology / Microbiology
 Lens and Cataract	
 Molecular Biology / Genetics / Epidemiology	
 Neuro-ophthalmology / Strabismology / Paediatric / History	
 Physiology / Biochemistry / Pharmacology	
 Pathology / Oncology	
 Retina / Vitreous	

Board members are elected for five years. In case none of the elected Board members has the Belgian nationality, the Board will immediately co-opt a supplementary Board member of Belgian nationality. At the end of their term of office, Board members are eligible to become President or Vice President of the Association for a term of one year. The President, the Vice-President and the Program Secretary are appointed by the Board.

The current officers, are:

 President: Prof. Alain Bron, France (2017-2018)
 Secretary General: Thomas Fuchsluger, Germany (2017-2022)
 Treasurer: Steffen Heegaard, Denmark (2014-2019)
 Program Secretary: Francesca Cordeiro, United Kingdom (2016-2021)

The Past Presidents of EVER are:

The Current Board Members are:
 Andreas Clemens
 Bahram BODAGHI
 Jean-Frederic CHIBRET
 Jean-Jacques DE LAEY
 Tero KIVELÄ
 Constantin J. POURNARAS
 Gabriela  SABORIO
 Gisèle SOUBRANE
 Marlene VERLAECKT

Official Journal
The official journal of EVER is Acta Ophthalmologica since April 2006. Since 2006, the EVER Board and the Board of the Acta Ophthalmologica Scandinavica Foundation have jointly organized an annual EVER-Acta Lecture at the time of the annual congress of EVER. The speaker is chosen in alternate years by the EVER Board and the Acta Board, and is honored with the EVER-Acta Silver Medal. The recipients of this medal and their keynote lecture topics so far are:

References

External links
 

Pan-European scientific societies
International professional associations based in Europe
Ophthalmology organizations
Scientific organizations established in 1997
1997 establishments in Europe